Sinaiyah Qadeem, also known as or Sinaiyah al-Kharj and simply sometimes as-Sinaiyah, is an industrial district, neighborhood and one of the subjects of  Baladiyah al-Malaz and Baladiyah al-Batha in southern Riyadh, Saudi Arabia, popular for its automobile workshops and spare parts stores. Spanned across 1900 hectares and bordered between Al Kharj Road to the west and Ali Ibn Abi Talib Road to the east, the district is also well-known for serving the Riyadh Rail Station, the western terminus of Dammam–Riyadh line and as the oldest industrial district for workshops in the city.

History
According to the Saudi Authority for Industrial Cities and Technology Zones, Sinaiyah Qadeem was established in 1976 during the time of King Khalid and thus, is the oldest industrial district in the Saudi capital for automobile workshops. Bordered with al-Malaz neighbourhood and Al Kharj Road, due to which it got the nickname Sinaiyah al-Kharj, The district is popular for its automobile workshops and spare parts stores in the entire city. In 1981, the Riyadh railway station was founded in north of the district.

Gallery

References

1976 establishments in Saudi Arabia
Neighbourhoods in Riyadh
Economy of Riyadh
Industrial parks